Nunapitchuk Airport  is a state-owned public-use airport located in Nunapitchuk, a city in the Bethel Census Area of the U.S. state of Alaska.

Facilities 
Nunapitchuk Airport has one runway designated 18/36 with a 2,040 x 60 ft (622 x 18 m) gravel surface. It also has one seaplane landing area designated NE/SW which measures 3,000 x 300 ft (914 x 91 m).

Airlines and destinations 

Prior to its bankruptcy and cessation of all operations, Ravn Alaska served the airport from multiple locations.

References

External links 
 FAA Alaska airport diagram (GIF)

Airports in the Bethel Census Area, Alaska